Fuchsia microphylla, also known as small leaf fuchsia and small-leaved fuchsia, is a flowering shrub in the family Onagraceae. The specific epithet (microphylla) was named for the plant's small (micro) leaves (phylla).

Distribution
Fuchsia microphylla is native to southern Mexico south to Panama.

Description
It is herbaceous, perennial, hermaphrodite and is pollinated by insects. It flowers from September to October and attracts wildlife. It is hardy to UK zone 9 and US zones 8–11, and is not frost tolerant. It is cold hardy to 10–15 F (−12.2 to −9.4 C) with wall shelter. It grows well in light, medium, and heavy soils and prefers moist, well-drained soils. It is suitable for acid, neutral, and basic soils. The fruit is edible and is dark in color, round in shape, and measures up to 1.5 centimeters in diameter, although it normally measures 5 millimeters in diameter. The flavor is sweet but mild. It normally forms clumps or bushes. It is both dioecious and self-fertile. The flowers are not fragrant and are tubular, pendent, and pink in color, and are very small. The leaves measure up to 4 centimeters in length, although are normally much smaller. They are generally oblanceolate to obovate in shape, although can be ovate or lanceolate and are usually toothed, though some varieties are not. New growth is red and the plant can be grown in a pot. Plants in the section Encliandra are defined by the protrusion of only four stamens from the flower tube, rather than eight. The other four stamens are enclosed within the tube.

Uses
The plant is grown as an ornamental and the berries are collected locally and eaten.

Pests
Fuchsia microphylla is vulnerable to whiteflies, capsid bugs, red spider mites, rust, aphids, black vine weevil, smut, gray mold, fuchsia gall mite, and fuchsia flea beetle. It is resistant to honey fungus and rabbits.

Hybrids
Fuchsia × bacillaris, a natural hybrid between Fuchsia microphylla and Fuchsia thymifolia, was documented in 1832.

See also
List of culinary fruits
List of fuchsia diseases

Gallery

References

Plants described in 1823
Flora of Mexico
microphylla
Flora of Central America
Fruit trees
Taxa named by Carl Sigismund Kunth
Dioecious plants
Fruits originating in North America
Ornamental plants